Minnesota State Highway 266 (MN 266) was a  highway in southwest Minnesota that had connected the communities of Wilmont and Reading to the city of Worthington. It was decommissioned in 2004, and was renumbered Nobles County State-Aid Highway 25.

Route description
Highway 266 was a northwest–southeast route connecting Wilmont and Reading to Interstate 90 on the northern border of the city of Worthington.  The entire route was located in Nobles County in southwest Minnesota.

The roadway was legally defined as Legislative Route 266 in the Minnesota Statutes § 161.115(197).

The route had followed 7th Street in Wilmont and 160th Street in Larkin Township.

History
Highway 266 was authorized on July 1, 1949. The route was removed from the state highway system in 2003.

The roadway was paved between Reading and Worthington at the time it was marked. The remainder was paved in 1950. It originally terminated at U.S. Highway 16 (now County State-Aid Highway 35) until that part of it was replaced by Interstate 90 in 1969. It then ran into Worthington city proper along Diagonal Road, terminating at U.S. 59 / State Highway 60. It was shortened to end at I-90 in the late 1980s.

Major intersections

References

External links

Highway 266 at the Unofficial Minnesota Highways Page

266